Everetts Church of Christ, also known as Everetts Christian Church, is a historic Disciples of Christ (DOC) church located at 109 S. Broad Street in Everetts, Martin County, North Carolina. It was built in 1923, and is a one-story, brick-veneered, Romanesque Revival building.  The front facade features three arched stained-glass windows and a two-story bell tower.

It was added to the National Register of Historic Places in 2005.

The senior pastor is Rev. Dr. Tony Warren, author of the highly acclaimed devotional book, Footsteps of Recovery The mailing address is Everetts Christian Church, PO Box 245, Everetts, NC 27828.

References

Christian Church (Disciples of Christ) congregations
Churches on the National Register of Historic Places in North Carolina
Romanesque Revival architecture in North Carolina
Churches completed in 1923
Churches in Martin County, North Carolina
National Register of Historic Places in Martin County, North Carolina